Live at Lincoln Hall is Joe Pug's first live album. The album was recorded at Lincoln Hall in Chicago.  The album includes a guest appearance by Strand of Oaks, who were touring with Pug at the time of the recording. It is the first album by Pug to include a cover: "Deep Dark Wells," based on the song "Start Again" by Austin musician Harvey "Tex" Thomas Young.

Track listing
 "Nobody's Man" - 4:03
 "Lock the Door Christina" - 2:56
 "I Do My Father's Drugs" - 3:15
 "Messenger" - 5:36
 "In the Meantime" - 4:23
 "Unsophisticated Heart" - 3:00
 "How Good You Are" - 4:13
 "The Door Was Always Open" - 3:46
 "Disguised As Someone Else" - 3:23
 "Hymn #101" - 5:30
 "Deep Dark Wells" - 2:57
 "Hymn #35" - 4:28
 "Call It What You Will" - 3:44
 "Nation of Heat" - 3:22
 "Speak Plainly Diana" - 4:38
 "Leave Ruin (Strand of Oaks)" - 3:52
 "Dodging the Wind" - 5:23

References

2011 live albums
Joe Pug albums
Lightning Rod Records albums